USS Lyman (DE-302) was an  of the United States Navy during World War II. She served in the Pacific Theatre, escorting convoys and other ships. She received a total of five battle stars for her service during the war, but was decommissioned and sold for scrap within 18 months of the war's end.

Namesake
Chan Lyman was born on 30 December 1912 in the township of Grandriver, Cass County, Missouri. He enlisted in the Navy on 23 August 1928 and completed 4 years in the United States Naval Reserve. After earning his Merchant Marine officer-s license, he was commissioned Ensign in the Naval Reserve 16 January 1940. Following the Attack on Pearl Harbor he was called to active duty and reported on 9 January 1942 to fleet oiler . On 7 May during the Battle of the Coral Sea, Neosho and its escorting destroyer were attacked by three separate flights of Imperial Japanese Navy aircraft and he was killed in the attack.

Construction and commissioning
She was laid down on 22 April 1943 by Mare Island Navy Yard, California; launched on 19 August 1943; sponsored by Mrs. Chan Lyman, wife of Ensign Lyman; and commissioned on 19 February 1944.

World War II Pacific Theater operations
Lyman cleared San Francisco Bay on 23 April 1944 for duty at Pearl Harbor as a training ship. With other destroyer escorts, she acted as target for fleet submarines and screen for escort carriers training flight squadrons. On 20 August she departed Pearl Harbor and began 13 months screening the supply ships of the U.S. 3rd Fleet and U.S. 5th Fleet. Arriving off Kossol Passage on 20 September, she screened the Western Garrison Group during the invasions of the Palau Islands. Departing Peleliu on 22 October, Lyman formed part of the escort which brought the 1st Marines to the Russell Islands.
 
Her first port availability period at Manus, Admiralty Islands, was marked on 10 November by the explosion of the  an ammunition ship nearby. Lyman weighed anchor on 16 December, screening auxiliaries supporting the invasion of Lingayen Gulf, Luzon. She returned to Ulithi on 14 January 1945, but again early in February was at sea protecting a replenishment group during the capture of Iwo Jima.

Damaged by a typhoon 
Her logistic support group was also in the Ryukyus from 22 March to 11 June supporting the battle for strategically important Okinawa. During this later action a typhoon of 5 June caused the ship to roll 65 degrees forcing the withdrawal of Lyman for repairs.
 
Underway again on 3 July, the destroyer escort ended the war guarding the supply ships of the 3rd Fleet, then striking the Japanese home islands.

End-of-war activity 
Lyman was the first DE to enter Tokyo Bay on 30 August with a group of tankers, she remained to witness the surrender ceremony of 2 September. Departing the next day she steamed eastward collecting passengers at each stop. She debarked 80 veterans at San Francisco on 8 October.

Post-war inactivation and decommissioning  
Inactivation began almost immediately and was completed after Lyman sailed to Richmond, California, on 8 November. Decommissioned on 5 December 1945, she was sold to the Puget Sound Navigation Co., Seattle, Washington, on 26 December 1946.

Awards  
Lyman received five battle stars for World War II service.

References

External links
 

 

Evarts-class destroyer escorts
Ships built in Vallejo, California
1943 ships
World War II frigates and destroyer escorts of the United States
Maritime incidents in November 1944